Walter Bauer (November 4, 1904 – December 23, 1976) was a German-Canadian biographer, novelist and poet.

Walter Bauer showed himself a promising poet in pre-Hitler Germany, but with the rise of the Nazis he found his poetry being banned. He became an elementary school teacher and after the war had high hopes for a literary life. However, in 1953, feeling the cynicism of the German Economic Miracle, he emigrated to Canada where, after a stint as a dishwasher, he became a professor in the German Department of the University of Toronto in Toronto, Ontario in 1954.

He wrote six novels, two collections of poetry and four biographies (including one on Van Gogh and another on Grey Owl). He also wrote plays and essays. He has been published in numerous literary magazines, such as Muschelhaufen.

Further reading 
 Arend, Angelika (1999). Documents of Protest and Compassion: The Poetry of Walter Bauer. McGill-Queen's University Press. .

References 

20th-century German poets
German emigrants to Canada
Academic staff of the University of Toronto
1976 deaths
1904 births
20th-century Canadian poets
20th-century Canadian male writers
Canadian male poets
German male poets